Ferris, also spelled Ferriss, is both a given name and a family name. It is related to the name Fergus in Ireland, and the name Ferrers in England. In Ireland, the Ferris family of County Kerry derives its surname from the patronymic Ó Fearghusa. It is also the English spelling of the similar Arabic derived name Faris (name).

People with the surname 
 A. Boyd Ferris (1929-1989), Canadian lawyer
 Aidan Ferris (born 1996), Scottish footballer
 Albert Warren Ferris (1856-1937), American psychiatrist
 Alex Ferris (born 1997), Canadian actor
 Andrea Ferris (born 1987), Panamanian middle-distance runner
 Anne Ferris (born 1954), Irish Labour politician
 Audrey Ferris (1909-1990), American actress
 Barbara Ferris (born 1942), British actress and model
 Ben Ferris, Australian filmmaker
 Benjamin Ferris (1780-1867), American watchmaker and historian
 Bob Ferris (born 1955), American Major League Baseball pitcher
 Charles G. Ferris (1796–1848), American Representative from New York
 Charles D. Ferris (born 1931), American Chairman of the Federal Communications Commission
 Christopher Ferris (born 1957), American computer scientist
 Cory Ferris, American bass guitarist from group Woe, is Me
 Costas Ferris (born 1935), Greek film director
 Ferris Danial (born 1992), Malaysian football player
 Dave Ferriss (1921-2016), American baseball pitcher
 David Lincoln Ferris (1864-1947), American bishop
 Dee Ferris (born 1973), British artist
 Devereaux Ferris (born 1994), New Zealand rugby union player
 Drew Ferris (born 1992), American National Football League player
 Edythe Ferris (1897–1995), American artist
 Elizabeth Ferris (disambiguation), several people
 Emil Ferris (born 1962), American comics creator
 Eugene W. Ferris (1842-1907), American soldier
 Evie Ferris, Australian ballerina
 Francis Ferris (1932–2018), British High Court judge
 Franklin Ferriss (1849–1933), justice of the Supreme Court of Missouri
 Geoff Ferris, Northern Ireland football manager
 Geoff Ferris (motorsport) (born 1936), British racing car designer
 George Ferris (disambiguation), several people
 Gerald R. Ferris, American professor
 Glenn Ferris (born 1950), American jazz trombonist
 Gordon Ferris (born 1952), British heavyweight boxer
 Gordon Floyd Ferris (1893–1958), American entomologist and professor of biology
 Grey Ferris (1946-2008), American attorney and politician
 Hank Ferris, American football coach
 Helene Ferris, first second-career female rabbi in Judaism
 Hobe Ferris (1877–1938), American Major League Baseball second baseman
 Hugh Ferris (disambiguation) or Ferriss, several people
 Isaac Ferris (1798-1873), president of New York University
 J. J. Ferris (1867–1900), Australian cricketer
 Jackson Ferris (rugby league) (born 1998), New Zealand Rugby League player
 Jackson Ferris (baseball) (born 2004), American baseball pitcher
 James Ferris (disambiguation) or Ferriss, several people
 Jason Ferris (born 1976), Australian rugby league footballer
 Jean Ferris (1939-2015), American writer
 Jean Leon Gerome Ferris (1863–1930), American painter
 Jeannie Ferris (1941–2007), Australian politician, lobbyist, and journalist
 Jeanine Pirro (née Ferris]], Lebanese-American political commentator and attorney
 Jim Ferris, American professor of Disabilities Studies
 Jimmy Ferris (1894-1934), Irish footballer
 Joe Ferris, American baseball pitcher 
 John Ferris (disambiguation), several people
 Joseph Ferris (1934-2020), American politician
 Joshua Ferris (born 1974), American author
 Joshua Beal Ferris (1804-1886), American politician
 Julie Ferris, Canadian member of music group Moev
 Kane Ferris (born 1984), New Zealand rugby league player
 Karl Ferris (born 1948), English music photographer/designer
 Keith Ferris (born 1929), American aviation artist
 Keltie Ferris (born 1977), American abstract painter
 Leo Ferris (1917-1993), American businessman
 Madison Ferris, American actress
 Martin Ferris (born 1952), Irish Sinn Féin politician
 Michael Ferris (politician) (1931–2000), Irish Labour Party politician
 Michelle Ferris (born 1976), Australian cyclist
 Michael Ferris, American screenwriter
 Mortimer Y. Ferris (1881–1941), New York state senator
 Neil Ferris (1927-1996), American footballer
 Orange Ferriss (1814–1894), American politician
 Pam Ferris (born 1948), German-born British actress
 Pat Ferris (born 1975), Canadian curler
 Paul Ferris (disambiguation), several people
 Pedro Ferris (1416-1478), Spanish Roman Catholic Bishop and cardinal
 Peewee Ferris, Australian DJ
 Ray Ferris (1920-1994), Irish footballer
 Richard J. Ferris (1936-2022), American businessman
 Roger Ferris, English pop composer
 Ron Ferris (born 1945), Canadian Anglican bishop
 Roxana Judkins Stinchfield Ferris (1895–1978), American botanist
 Sam Ferris (1900-1980), British long-distance running athlete
 Samantha Ferris (born 1968), Canadian actress
 Sarge Ferris (1928-1989), American poker player
 Scott Ferris (1877-1945), American Representative from Oklahoma
 Sharon Ferris (born 1974), New Zealand sailor
 Sid Ferris, (c.1908-1993), English cyclist
 Stephen Ferris (born 1985), Irish Rugby Union player
 Solomon Ferris (c.1748–1803), British naval officer
 Tevin Ferris (born 1996), Australian rugby union player
 Theodore E. Ferris (1872–1953), American naval architect
 Tim Ferriss (born 1977), American investor, author and lifestyle guru
 Timothy Ferris (born 1944), American Pulitzer Prize-nominated science writer
 Toiréasa Ferris (born 1980), Irish Sinn Féin politician
 Tom Ferris, Canadian member of music group Moev
 Tony Ferris (born 1961), New Zealand footballer
 Wayne Ferris (born 1953), American wrestler known as the 'Honky Tonk Man'
 Wesley Ferris (1927-2001), Irish cricketer
 William Ferris (politician) (1855-1917), Australian politician
 William H. Ferris (1874–1941), African American author, minister, and scholar
 William R. Ferris (born 1942), American author and scholar
 Woodbridge N. Ferris (1853-1928), American educator

People with the given name 
 Ferris Ashton (1926-2013), Australian rugby league footballer
 Ferris Bolton (1853–1937), Canadian politician
 Ferris Fain (1921–2001), American Major League Baseball first baseman
 Ferris S. Fitch Jr. (1853–1920), American politician
 Ferris Foreman (1808–1901), American lawyer, politician, and soldier
 Ferris Greenslet (1875–1959), American editor and writer
 Ferris Taylor (1888–1961), American film actor
 Ferris Webster (1912–1989), American film editor

Fictional characters 
 Ferris Bueller, the protagonist of the film Ferris Bueller's Day Off and television series Ferris Bueller
 Ben Ferris, the real name of Cinder from the Killer Instinct video game series
 Bob Ferris (Likely Lads), a British sitcom character
 Carol Ferris, a DC Comics character

See also 
 Farris (surname)
 Faris (name)